Mairangi Bay is a coastal suburb of North Shore, Auckland, located in the northern North Island of New Zealand, on the south-east-facing peninsula forming the northern side of the Waitematā Harbour. Mairangi Bay came under the local governance of the North Shore City Council until subsumed into the Auckland Council in 2010.

The Bay's beach itself has, along with adjacent Murrays and Campbells Bays, undergone civil works projects since 2004 to improve stormwater management.

Demographics

Mairangi Bay had a population of 5,646 at the 2018 New Zealand census, an increase of 300 people (5.6%) since the 2013 census, and an increase of 369 people (7.0%) since the 2006 census. There were 1,866 households, comprising 2,721 males and 2,928 females, giving a sex ratio of 0.93 males per female, with 1,056 people (18.7%) aged under 15 years, 1,050 (18.6%) aged 15 to 29, 2,646 (46.9%) aged 30 to 64, and 900 (15.9%) aged 65 or older.

Ethnicities were 70.4% European/Pākehā, 5.0% Māori, 1.8% Pacific peoples, 27.3% Asian, and 2.3% other ethnicities. People may identify with more than one ethnicity.

The percentage of people born overseas was 43.9, compared with 27.1% nationally.

Although some people chose not to answer the census's question about religious affiliation, 53.6% had no religion, 37.1% were Christian, 0.1% had Māori religious beliefs, 0.7% were Hindu, 0.5% were Muslim, 1.0% were Buddhist and 1.5% had other religions.

Of those at least 15 years old, 1,671 (36.4%) people had a bachelor's or higher degree, and 342 (7.5%) people had no formal qualifications. 1,227 people (26.7%) earned over $70,000 compared to 17.2% nationally. The employment status of those at least 15 was that 2,235 (48.7%) people were employed full-time, 810 (17.6%) were part-time, and 108 (2.4%) were unemployed.

Education
Mairangi Bay School was founded in 1967. St John's is a state integrated Catholic School, which was founded in 1961.

Rangitoto College is a large secondary school in Windsor Park, to the west of Mairangi Bay.

References

External links
 Mairangi Bay School website
 St Johns School website
 Photographs of Mairangi Bay held in Auckland Libraries' heritage collections.

Suburbs of Auckland
North Shore, New Zealand
Bays of the Auckland Region
East Coast Bays